Leucographus is a genus of longhorn beetles of the subfamily Lamiinae.

 Leucographus albovarius Waterhouse, 1878
 Leucographus alluaudi Fairmaire, 1897
 Leucographus catalai Villiers, 1939
 Leucographus variegatus Waterhouse, 1878

References

Crossotini